Ross McLean may refer to:

 Ross McLean (politician) (born 1944), former Liberal member of the Australian House of Representatives
 Ross McLean (civil servant) (1905–1984), Canadian journalist and civil servant
 Ross McLean (musician), artist and music producer
 Ross McLean (cricketer) (born 1981), English cricketer